Andrew Carstairs-McCarthy (born 27 August 1945) is a linguist and Emeritus Professor of Linguistics at the University of Canterbury (Christchurch, New Zealand). He is known for his expertise on morphology and word formation.

Books
Allomorphy in Inflexion. London: Croom Helm. 271pp. 1987.  (With Andrew Carstairs as the named author.) Abingdon, Oxon: Routledge, 2013. , . (With Andrew Carstairs-McCarthy as the named author.) 
Current Morphology. London: Routledge. 289pp. 1992. , . 2002. .
The Origins of Complex Language: An inquiry into the evolutionary beginnings of sentences, syllables and truth. Oxford: Oxford University Press. 260pp. 1999. .
An Introduction to English Morphology. Edinburgh: Edinburgh University Press. 151pp. 2002. 
2nd edition, 2018.
The Evolution of Morphology. Oxford: Oxford University Press. 272pp. 2010.  .
Zeus, Jupiter, Jesus and the Catholic Church: What Good Is a God? Newcastle upon Tyne: Cambridge Scholars Publishing. 150pp. 2021. .

References

External links
 Andrew Carstairs-McCarthy

1945 births
20th-century linguists
21st-century New Zealand linguists
British expatriate academics
English expatriates in New Zealand
Linguists from England
Linguists of English
Living people
Morphologists
Academic staff of the University of Canterbury